Mithrodia clavigera is a species of tropical starfish in the family Mithrodiidae. It has pale flesh tone with large brick-red patches. Its Specimens preserved in alcohol become uniformly white.

References

Further reading

External links
 

Mithrodiidae
Animals described in 1816